This is a list of notable people who were either born or have lived in Staten Island, today a borough of New York City, New York, at some time in their lives. The list does not include people who were only in Staten Island as college students, military personnel, or prisoners. Approximately 800 people (or performing groups) are listed alphabetically under their primary vocations, which themselves are listed alphabetically.

Actors, actresses, dancers, models, film and TV

Past

Phyllis Allen (1861–1938) – comedian who worked with fellow Staten Island native Mabel Normand and other silent-film stars
Arthur Anderson (1922–2016) – actor of radio, stage, film, and television; voice of Lucky Charms leprechaun
Leslie Barrett (1919–2010) – frequent actor in theater and television, especially 1950s–1960s
Maurice Barrymore (born Herbert Blythe, 1849–1905) – vaudeville actor; father of John, Lionel, and Ethel Barrymore; lived in Fort Wadsworth, with their grandmother Louisa Lane Drew
John Dehner (1915–1992) – television and movie actor; born on Staten Island
Raoul Pene Du Bois (1914–1985) – costume and scenic designer for stage and film; two-time Tony Award winner
David Dukes (1945–2000) – stage, television and movie actor; lived briefly in Brighton Heights, Staten Island
Joey Faye (born Joseph Antony Palladino, c.1909–1997) – comic actor in vaudeville, theater, films and television
David Froman (1938–2010) – portrayed twins Gunther and Bruno on The Edge of Night, and Lt. Bob Brooks on Matlock; once lived in Livingston
Ben Grauer (1908–1977) – longtime broadcaster on radio and television
Neal Hart (1879–1949) – actor and director of silent films
Allen Jenkins (born Alfred McGonegal, 1900–1974) – character actor, voice of cartoon Top Cats Officer Dibble; born on Staten Island
Betsy Joslyn (born 1954) – Broadway actress, best known for Sweeney Todd
Thomas W. Keene (born Thomas R. Eagleson, 1840–1898) – Shakespearean actor
Guy Kibbee (1882–1956) – stage and film actor, father of CUNY Chancellor Robert Kibbee
Paul Land (born Paul Calandrillo, 1956–2007) – actor, Spring Break, The Idolmaker
Robert Loggia (1930–2015) – actor, Scarface, The Sopranos, Big; attended New Dorp High School and Wagner College
Allan Manings (1924–2010) – television producer and comedy writer, best known for Rowan & Martin's Laugh-In, Good Times, One Day at a Time
Paul Newman (1925–2008) – Academy Award winning actor; married to Joanne Woodward; lived in St. George, Staten Island
Mabel Normand (1892–1930) – silent film actress, director, writer, producer; frequent collaborator with Fatty Arbuckle, Charlie Chaplin, Mack Sennett; grew up in New Brighton
Edward Platt (1916–1974) – actor who played "The Chief" on the 1960s TV show Get Smart; born on Staten Island
Frances Robinson (born Marion Frances Ladd, 1916–1971) – actress in early films
Ivy Scott (1886–1947) – actress on radio and Broadway
Raymond Serra (1936–2003) – actor in television and films, including Gotti and the first two Teenage Mutant Ninja Turtles movies
Don Stewart (1935–2006) – actor, best known for his long-running role as attorney Mike Bauer on Guiding Light
Robert Taber (1865–1904) – Shakespearean actor; brother of mathematician Henry Taber, both born on Staten Island
Joanne Woodward (born 1930) – Academy Award winning actress; married to Paul Newman; lived in St. George

Recent

Betty Aberlin – children's television actress known for Mister Rogers' Neighborhood
Frank Albanese (1931–2015) – actor known for playing mobsters, most notably "Uncle Pat" on The Sopranos
Yancey Arias – actor
Gerald Arpino (1923–2008) – dancer, choreographer, co-founder of the Joffrey Ballet
Alexandra Barreto – actress in television and film
Jedediah Bila – conservative television host; Wagner College valedictorian
Mike Bocchetti – stand-up comedian and radio personality 
Patrick Breen – frequent television actor
Kathy Brier – actress in television and musical theater
Mickey Burns – television host and producer, best known for the celebrity interview show Profiles
Syma Chowdhry – model and television reporter
Eric Close – actor who plays Martin Fitzgerald on the CBS drama Without a Trace
Sheena Colette – actress on Gossip Girl, White Collar; model in W magazine, Elle; graduated from St. Joseph by the Sea
Pete Davidson – comedian, Saturday Night Live
Drita D'Avanzo – reality television personality
Laura Dean – choreographer known for whirling dances
James DeMonaco – screenwriter, director and producer, best known for The Purge franchise
Michael Drayer – actor, Mr. Robot, The Sopranos
Selita Ebanks – Victoria's Secret model
Rich Eisen – former ESPN host; current host for the NFL Network
Frances Esemplare (1934–2017) – actress who played Nucci Gualtieri on The Sopranos
Jennifer Esposito – actress, Spin City, Summer of Sam; attended Moore Catholic High School
Emilio Estevez – actor; oldest son of Janet and Martin Sheen; born on Staten Island
Christine Evangelista – actress; star of The Arrangement
Robert Funaro – actor, The Sopranos, played Eugene Pontecorvo; lives in New Dorp
Chris Galletta – screenwriter of The Kings of Summer
Joe Gatto – comedian in The Tenderloins, featured on Impractical Jokers
Gee Money (born Gary Euton) – radio and television personality and actor
Buddy Giovinazzo – filmmaker and author, best known for Combat Shock and Life is Hot in Cracktown
Carmine Giovinazzo – actor who plays Detective Danny Messer on the CBS drama CSI: NY; cousin of Buddy Giovinazzo and Larry Romano
Karl Girolamo – film and television actor
Jenn Graziano – executive producer of Staten Island-based reality TV show Mob Wives
Renee Graziano – cast member of Mob Wives; sister of Jenn
Dan Grimaldi – actor, The Sopranos twins Philly and Patsy Parisi; former resident
Vinny Guadagnino – of MTV's Jersey Shore; born and raised on Staten Island
Patti Hansen – model; wife of The Rolling Stones' Keith Richards; graduated from Tottenville High School
Melanie Iglesias – model and TV actress
Hassan Johnson – actor, featured in The Wire, Belly
Rebekka Johnson – actress, best known for playing Dawn Rivecca on Netflix's wrestling comedy GLOW
Colin Jost – comedian and writer, best known for Saturday Night Live
Florina Kaja – socialite; TV personality; cast member of Season 4 of the reality television series Bad Girls Club
Jon and Al Kaplan – musical parody writers, best known for Silence! The Musical
Tim Kelleher – film, TV, and stage actor, writer, director; attended PS 35, OLGC and Msgr. Farrell
Yunjin Kim – actress, Lost
Sukanya Krishnan – news anchor; graduated from New Dorp High School
John Lavelle – stage, film, and television actor
Bob Levy – comedian and radio personality known as "The Reverend"
Annette D'Agostino Lloyd – silent film historian
Jeremy Luke – film and television actor
Jon Lung – product designer, graphic designer and co-host of the TV series Mythbusters
Jamie Lynn Macchia – Miss New York 2015
Larry Marshall – performer in musical theater and film
Craig Mazin – screenwriter known for The Hangover sequels and Chernobyl miniseries
Alyssa Milano – film and television actress; raised on Staten Island
Patty Mullen – actress and model; born and raised on Staten Island
James Murray – comedian in The Tenderloins, featured on Impractical Jokers
Julius R. Nasso – film producer, notably including 1990s association with Steven Seagal
Garry Pastore – film and television actor; documentary director; brother of Eric Blackwood (musician) and cousin of Vincent Pastore
Eddie Pepitone – actor and standup comedian
Otto Petersen (1960–2014) – comedian and ventriloquist, known for his act "Otto and George"
Angelina Pivarnick – former cast member of MTV's Jersey Shore seasons 1–2; born and raised on Staten Island
Brian Quinn – comedian in The Tenderloins, featured on Impractical Jokers
Robin Quivers – radio personality from The Howard Stern Show; lives on Staten Island
Jack Radcliffe (born Frank Martini) – pornographic film actor
Michael Rainey Jr. – actor, Power
Angela Raiola (1960–2016) – Big Ang, star of Mob Wives
Tony Reali – "Stat Boy" on Pardon the Interruption; host of Around the Horn on ESPN
Greg Rikaart – television actor and Daytime Emmy winner, best known as Kevin Fisher from The Young and the Restless
Pat Robertson – TV personality and evangelist; found his interest in religion while living on Staten Island in the 1950s
Larry Romano – actor, The King of Queens, NYPD Blue
James Rosen – TV journalist; raised on Staten Island
Theo Rossi – actor, Sons of Anarchy
Ronen Rubinstein – actor, 9-1-1: Lone Star
Gianni Russo – actor, played Carlo Rizzi in The Godfather; raised on Staten Island
Glenn Scarpelli – child actor from One Day at a Time; son of comic book artist Henry Scarpelli
Steve Schirripa – actor, producer, voice-over artist; Bobby Bacala from The Sopranos
Ricky Schroder – TV and film actor, The Champ, Silver Spoons, NYPD Blue, 24, Strong Medicine
Steven Seagal – actor, lived on Staten Island
Brendan Sexton III – film and television actor
Janet Sheen – actress and producer; she and Martin Sheen had first child Emilio Estevez while living in St. George
Martin Sheen (born Ramón Estévez) – actor, best known for Apocalypse Now and The West Wing
Peter Sollett – film director and screenwriter, known for Raising Victor Vargas and Nick & Norah's Infinite Playlist
Michael "The Situation" Sorrentino – from MTV'S Jersey Shore; born on Staten Island
Kevin Sussman – actor and comedian, known for Ugly Betty and The Big Bang Theory
The Tenderloins (Joe Gatto, James Murray, Brian Quinn, Sal Vulcano) – comedy troupe featured on Impractical Jokers
Chris Terrio – film director and screenwriter; won Academy Award for Argo screenplay
Eddie Kaye Thomas – actor, Paul Finch in the American Pie movies; born and raised in New Dorp
Jeff Trachta – TV actor, The Bold and the Beautiful, America's Got Talent
Lenny Venito – actor, War of the Worlds
Sal Vulcano – comedian in The Tenderloins, featured on Impractical Jokers
Brian Whitman – radio host, impersonator, comedian
Tristan Wilds – actor, The Wire, 90210; Grammy-nominated recording artist known as Mack Wilds
Ben Younger – screenwriter and director of Boiler Room, Prime, Bleed for This

Architects

Nathan Franklin Barrett (1845–1919) – landscape architect; co-founder and president of American Society of Landscape Architects
David Carnivale (b. 1958) – known for historic preservation efforts on Staten Island; raised in Richmondtown
John Merven Carrère (1858–1911) – designer of New York Public Library Main Branch and Staten Island Borough Hall; lived in Clifton
Ernest Flagg (1857–1947) – designer of many commercial and residential buildings, including his estate on Todt Hill; brother-in-law of Charles Scribner II
Daniel Paul Higgins (1886–1953) – designer of many prominent American buildings, especially for churches including his own St. Clare's in Great Kills
Frederick Law Olmsted (1822–1903) – landscape architect known for Central Park and Brooklyn’s Prospect Park; lived in Annadale's Olmsted–Beil House
Frederick Law Olmsted Jr. (1870–1957) – landscape architect known for national parks; son of Frederick Sr.
John Charles Olmsted (1852–1920) – landscape architect known for urban parks; nephew and adopted son of Frederick Sr.
Kenneth Olwig (b. 1946) – professor of Scandinavian landscape architecture
Edward Sargent (1842–1914) – designer of many homes, schools and office buildings; Tompkinsville resident

Artists

Rocco Armento (1924–2011) – sculptor, born and raised in Staten Island
Alice Austen (1866–1952) – pioneering photographer, lifelong Staten Island resident; the MV Alice Austen ferry is named after her
Wallace Berman (1926–1976) – collage artist of the Beat movement
Mathew Brady (1822–1896) – Civil War photographer; moved to Staten Island around 1850 with his wife Julia
Alfred Thompson Bricher (1837–1908) – landscape painter associated with White Mountain art and the Hudson River School
Mario Buatta (1935–2018) – interior decorator for large American homes; born in West Brighton; attended Curtis High School
John Celardo (1918–2012) – illustrator of the Tarzan comic strip
Ceil Chapman (1912–1979) – award-winning designer of fashion dresses
Howard Chaykin (b. 1950) – comic book artist
Cassius Marcellus Coolidge (1844–1934) – created Dogs Playing Poker; lived in Grasmere toward the end of his life
Fred S. Cozzens (1846–1928) – maritime artist
Jasper Francis Cropsey (1823–1900) – landscape painter of the Hudson River School; born on his family's farm in Rossville
Edward DeGroff (1860–1910) – historic photographer and merchant in the District of Alaska
Evan Dorkin (b. 1965) – cartoonist and creator of Milk & Cheese; longtime resident of Staten Island
John Gossage (b. 1946) – photographer, noted for artist's books exploring the urban environment
Percy Leason (1889–1959) – Australian-born painter, illustrator, and political cartoonist
Grace Hamilton McIntyre (1878–1962) – painter of portrait miniatures
P. Buckley Moss – painter known for scenes of rural Virginia
John A. Noble (1913–1983) – maritime lithographer and artist; a Staten Island Ferry was named after him
Timothy H. O'Sullivan (c.1840–1882) – government photographer, prominent in frontier exploration and the Civil War
William Page (1811–1885) – painter and portrait artist
Jacques Reich (1852–1923) – portrait artist
Mick Rock (born Michael Edward Chester Smith, 1948–2021) – photographer of rock music acts
William Allen Rogers (1854–1931) – political cartoonist, including decades with Harper's Weekly and the New York Herald
Henry Scarpelli (1930–2010) – artist for DC Comics and Archie Comics; father of actor Glenn Scarpelli
Francesco Scavullo (1921–2004) – celebrity photographer; born on Staten Island
Henry Fitch Taylor (1853–1925) – Modernist painter
Charles Tefft (1874–1951) – architectural sculptor
Cynthia von Buhler – artist and children's book author; Staten Island resident 2005–2008
George Woodbridge (1930–2004) – illustrator for Mad magazine and history books; lived on Staten Island
Sarah Yuster (b. 1957) – painter of landscapes and portraits

Business, labor, philanthropy

William Henry Aspinwall (1807–1875) – shipping magnate; co-founder of ASPCA and Metropolitan Museum; died at his country estate on Aspinwall Street in Tottenville
William Bard (1778–1853) – founder of New York Life Insurance and Trust Company; namesake of Bard Avenue
Ella Reeve Bloor (1862–1951) – labor organizer and socialist
Roderick Cameron (1825–1900) – shipping executive and horse breeder
Barbara Chernow – administrative leader for schools and universities
Rufus King Delafield (1802–1874) – banker and cement manufacturer; namesake of Delafield Place
W. Butler Duncan I (1830–1912) – Scottish-born banker; head of Mobile and Ohio Railroad
John Eberhard Faber (1822–1879) – German-born manufacturer of pencils
Joseph Giacomo Ferari (1868–1953) – lion tamer and circus owner at Dreamland on Coney Island
James Clair Flood (1826–1889) – built a fortune from silver mining in Nevada's Comstock Lode
Lisa Garcia Quiroz (1961–2018) – business executive at Time Warner
Mott Green (born David Friedman, 1966–2013) – founder of the environmentally sustainable Grenada Chocolate Company
William H. Friedland (1923–2018) – sociologist, labor activist and researcher
Richard Guarasci – college administrator, including 18th president of Wagner College
Baruch Herzfeld – provider of community webcasting and bicycling
William Horrmann (1863–1927) – head of Rubsam & Horrmann Brewing Co.; built Horrmann Castle atop Grymes Hill
Denis M. Hughes – president of New York State AFL–CIO since 1999; born and raised on Staten Island
Charles Wallace Hunt (1841–1911) – producer of coal-handling equipment
James Jebbia – founder of Supreme, an international clothing brand and skateboard retailer
George H. Kendall (c.1854–1924) – president of New York Bank Note Company that printed stock certificates
Josephine Shaw Lowell (1843–1905) – co-founder of National Consumers League and other charities for women; sister of Colonel Robert Gould Shaw
Oroondates Mauran (1791–1846) – owner of steamship and ferry operations
John A. McMullen – senior advisor to corporate and government leaders
John Mojecki (1865–1951) – Polish-born homebuilder and philanthropist
Paul Montauk (1922–1998) – political and labor activist with the Socialist Workers Party
Michael Mulgrew – president of United Federation of Teachers since 2009
Ralph Munroe (1851–1933) – yacht designer and pioneering settler of Miami
Samuel I. Newhouse (1927–2017) – billionaire co-owner of Advance Publications
Eugenius Harvey Outerbridge (1860–1932) – fiberboard industrialist; co-founder of Richmond County Country Club; chairman of Port Authority; namesake of Outerbridge Crossing; brother of tennis pioneer Mary Ewing Outerbridge
Edward Martineau Perine (1809–1905) – Alabama merchant and plantation owner; born on Staten Island and descended from Daniel Perrin, "The Huguenot"
George Haven Putnam (1844–1930) – president of book publisher G. P. Putnam's Sons
John Bishop Putnam (1849–1915) – treasurer and director of book publisher G. P. Putnam's Sons; brother of George Haven Putnam
Bradhurst Schieffelin (1824–1909) – drugmaking and petroleum business; social activist
Sarah Blake Sturgis Shaw (1815–1902) – abolitionist, women's rights supporter, philanthropist, mother of Robert Gould Shaw and Josephine Shaw Lowell
Anson Phelps Stokes (1838–1913) – partner in family's Phelps Dodge Mining Company; his 10-acre mansion was next to Curtis High School; namesake of notable clergymen son and grandson
Edith Minturn Stokes (1867–1937) – philanthropist, daughter of shipping magnate Robert Bowne Minturn Jr., daughter-in-law of mining executive Anson Phelps Stokes
Van Toffler (b. 1960) – longtime MTV executive, rising to President of Viacom Media Networks Music Group 2008–2015
Gustavus Trask (1836–1914) – sea captain; governor of Sailors' Snug Harbor
Vanderbilt family – wealthy Dutch-American railroad owners and heirs, including many 19th-century Staten Island residents and the church-sized Vanderbilt Mausoleum in New Dorp's Moravian Cemetery
Cornelius Vanderbilt (1794–1877) – shipping and railroad magnate; wealthiest person in America; born and lived on Staten Island; father-in-law of local politician Nicholas B. La Bau
Cornelius Vanderbilt II (1843–1899) – railroad magnate; son of William Henry Vanderbilt
Cornelius Vanderbilt IV (1898–1974) – newspaper publisher, author, film producer; grandson of Cornelius Vanderbilt II
Cornelius Jeremiah Vanderbilt (1830–1882) – troubled son of Cornelius Vanderbilt
Eliza Osgood Vanderbilt Webb (1860–1936) – founder of Shelburne Farms in Vermont; daughter of William Henry Vanderbilt
Emily Thorn Vanderbilt (1852–1946) – philanthropist; founder of Sloane Hospital for Women; daughter of William Henry Vanderbilt; great-great-grandmother of Timothy Olyphant
Florence Adele Vanderbilt Twombly (1854–1952) – known for building elaborate homes; daughter of William Henry Vanderbilt
Frank Armstrong Crawford Vanderbilt (1839–1885) – second wife of Cornelius Vanderbilt; persuaded him to fund Tennessee's Vanderbilt University
Frederick William Vanderbilt (1856–1938) – railroad executive; son of William Henry Vanderbilt
George Washington Vanderbilt II or III (1862–1914) – born in New Dorp; built North Carolina's Biltmore Estate; son of William Henry Vanderbilt
Margaret Louisa Vanderbilt Shepard (1845–1924) – founder of YWCA hotel; daughter of William Henry Vanderbilt
Reginald Claypoole Vanderbilt (1880–1925) – founder of many equestrian organizations; son of Cornelius Vanderbilt II; father of Gloria Vanderbilt; grandfather of Anderson Cooper
William Henry Vanderbilt (1821–1885) – railroad magnate and philanthropist; wealthiest person in America; son of Cornelius Vanderbilt
William Kissam Vanderbilt (1849–1920) – railroad executive; horse breeder; son of William Henry Vanderbilt
Arthur von Briesen (1843–1920) – lawyer, philanthropist, president of Legal Aid Society; estate became Von Briesen Park next to Fort Wadsworth
Erastus Wiman (1834–1904) – president of the Staten Island Railway Co. and the St. George Ferry

Crime

Richard Biegenwald (1940–2008) – serial killer who murdered at least six people in New Jersey
Thomas Bilotti (1940–1985) – underboss of Gambino crime family; was assassinated with Paul Castellano
Frank Cali (1965–2019) – Gambino crime boss who had close ties to Sicily
Anthony Capo (1959/1960–2012) – hitman for DeCavalcante crime family; government informant
Stephen Caracappa (1941–2017) – former detective convicted of eight murders for the Gambino and Lucchese crime families
Paul Castellano (1915–1985) – Gambino crime boss; lived on Todt Hill; buried in Moravian Cemetery in an unmarked grave
Frank DeCicco (1935–1986) – Gambino underboss
Aniello Dellacroce (1914–1985) – Gambino underboss; lived in Grasmere, Staten Island
Michael DiLeonardo (b. 1955) – Gambino caporegime and government informant
James Failla (1919–1999) – senior caporegime with the Gambino crime family
Gus Farace (1960–1989) – associate of Bonanno crime family; murdered a teenager and a federal agent
Eddie Garafola (b. 1955) – Gambino caporegime; brother-in-law of Sammy Gravano
Sammy "The Bull" Gravano – Gambino underboss and government informant
Anthony Graziano (1940–2019) – consigliere of Bonanno crime family
Joseph Masella (c.1948–1998) – associate of DeCavalcante crime family
Frank Matthews – major trafficker of heroin and cocaine
Xhevdet Mustafa (1940–1982) – failed assassin of the leader of communist Albania
"Staten Island Ninja" – serial burglar, possibly deported to Albania, never positively identified
Chris Paciello (born Christian Ludwigsen) – affiliate of Bonanno, Colombo, Gambino crime families; government informant
Andre Rand (born Frank Rushan) (b. 1944) – convicted kidnapper of two children; suspected serial killer
George Remini (1945–2007) – member of Gambino crime family
Gregory Scarpa (1928–1994) – hitman for Colombo crime family
Anthony Spero (1929–2008) – consigliere of Bonanno crime family
Joseph Vollaro (b. 1966) – Gambino associate and government informant
Ronell Wilson (b. 1982) – convicted killer of two undercover detectives
John Zancocchio (b. 1958) – consigliere of Bonanno crime family

Historical notables and early settlers

Pierre Billiou (c.1632–c.1702) – early settler, founder of Old Town
David Pietersz. de Vries (c.1593–1655) – Dutch explorer and early settler
Mamie Fish (1853–1915) – New York socialite and one of the so-called Triumvirate of American Gilded Age society
Peter Fisher (1782–1848) – historian of colonial New Brunswick, Canada; born on Staten Island
Loring McMillen (1906–1991) – official historian of Staten Island; founder of Historic Richmond Town
Cornelis Melyn (1600–c.1662) – early settler, political figure, and Patroon
Jeremiah O'Donovan Rossa (1831–1915) and Mary Jane O'Donovan Rossa (1845–1916) – husband-and-wife activists for Irish independence; ancestors of politician Jerome X. O'Donovan and writer William Rossa Cole
Daniel Perrin (1642–1719) – early settler known as "The Huguenot"

Inventors

Thomas Adams (1818–1905) – inventor of modern chewing gum; William Wrigley Jr. associate; Island resident in the 1860s–1870s
Albert Baez (1912–2007) – co-inventor of X-ray microscope; father of folk singer Joan Baez
Charles Goodyear (1800–1860) – inventor of vulcanized rubber; lived on Staten Island for several years in the 1830s
Jerome H. Lemelson (1923–1997) – inventor of many electronic technologies; holder of 605 patents
Gustav A. Mayer (1845–1918) – inventor of the Nilla wafer; lived in a mansion that still stands in New Dorp
Antonio Meucci (1808–1889) – inventor of an early form of the telephone; immigrated in 1850, settled in the Clifton area
Frederick Walton (1834–1928) – built first American linoleum factory in "Linoleumville", today's Travis
Charles Rudolph Wittemann (1884–1967) – aviation pioneer; built the world's first airplane factory on Staten Island; co-founded Teterboro Airport

Military and government

Donald Armstrong (1889–1984) – Brigadier General in the US Army during World War II
Richard Bayley (1745–1801) – first health officer of the Port of New York, in charge of Staten Island quarantine station; father of Elizabeth Ann Bayley Seton; grandfather of James Roosevelt Bayley
Taylor G. Belcher (1920–1990) – United States Ambassador to Cyprus and Peru
Edward Clyde Benfold (1931–1952) – US Navy hospital corpsman killed in the Korean War; Medal of Honor recipient
Andrew E. K. Benham (1832–1905) – Admiral, United States Navy
Christopher Billop (c.1738–1827) – British Loyalist colonel during the American Revolution; Staten Island home was the landmark Conference House
Christopher Billopp (c.1638–1726) – English naval officer; great-grandfather of Christopher Billop; Staten Island home became the Conference House
Vincent R. Capodanno (1929–1967) – Chaplain and Lieutenant in US Navy; Medal of Honor recipient; Maryknoll Catholic priest and candidate for sainthood
Salvatore Cassano (b. 1945) – New York City Fire Commissioner 2010–2014
John J. Cisco (1806–1884) – Assistant Treasurer of the United States for three Presidents
Marcia Clark – prosecutor in the O. J. Simpson trial; graduated from Susan E. Wagner High School; lived in Manor Heights
Kevin J. Collins – senior aide to Republican Party politicians
Ichabod Crane (1787–1857) – military officer for 48 years; nominal inspiration for the fictional protagonist in The Legend of Sleepy Hollow; buried in Staten Island
Thomas D. Doubleday (1816–1864) – Wall Street merchant; Colonel in Civil War; lived in Port Richmond; brother of Abner Doubleday
Trevor N. Dupuy (1916–1995) – US Army colonel; prominent military historian
Sara Ehrman (1919–2017) – senior aide to national Democratic Party politicians
Fred Espenak – NASA scientist, eclipse expert; born and educated on Staten Island
Giuseppe Garibaldi (1807–1882) – Italian revolutionary and statesman; lived for a time on Staten Island
Eric Garner (1970–2014) – former NYC Parks employee, fatally choked by police while being arrested for unlicensed cigarettes
Irving Hale (1861–1930) – brigadier general who served in the Philippines during the Spanish–American War
Maura Harty – United States Assistant Secretary of State for Consular Affairs
Louis V. Iasiello – Rear Admiral; Chief of Navy Chaplains 2003–2006; Franciscan Catholic priest
Patrick Henry Jones (1830–1900) – Civil War brigadier general; Postmaster of New York City
Thomas Jordan (1819–1895) – Civil War general and author
Andrew Juxon-Smith (1931–1996) – head of Sierra Leone military government 1967–1968
Lewis A. Kaplan – US District Court Judge in New York
Robert Kibbee (1921–1982) – Chancellor of the City University of New York; son of actor Guy Kibbee
Robert S. Lasnik – US District Court Judge in Washington state
James E. Leonard – Chief of New York City Fire Department 2014–2019
Cecil B. Lyon (1903–1993) – US Ambassador to Chile, Sri Lanka, and the Maldives
Jeb Stuart Magruder (1934–2014) – Staten Island native; Watergate figure in Nixon White House; Presbyterian minister
John Marburger (1941–2011) – director of Brookhaven National Laboratory; science advisor to President George W. Bush
Francis Xavier McQuade (1878–1955) – New York City judge; advocate for Sunday baseball; part-owner of New York Giants
Angel Mendez (1946–1967) – US Marine awarded the Navy Cross for his death in Vietnam War; raised at Mount Loretto
Joseph F. Merrell (1926–1945) – Medal of Honor recipient in World War II
Mersereau Ring – Staten Island family that supported the American Revolution with extensive spying activities, 1776–1781
Ed Murphy – peace and labor activist; organizer of Vietnam Veterans Against the War and the Workforce Development Institute
Robert Nelson (1794–1873) – physician; general of Canadian army rebelling unsuccessfully against British colonial rule
Joe Pistone – FBI agent, best known as Donnie Brasco; lived in Staten Island for a brief period
Joseph Rallo – leader of public universities; Commissioner of Higher Education for Louisiana
Muhamed Sacirbey – Bosnian diplomat
Louis N. Scarcella (b. 1951/1952) – NYPD homicide detective involved in 15 overturned convictions
Les Schneider (b. 1939) – US Air Force pilot, known for Gemini 8 rescue mission
Robert Gould Shaw (1837–1863) – colonel who headed the Union Army's first African American regiment, subject of the feature film Glory
Richard Sheirer (1946–2012) – senior official in NYC Fire Department, Police Department, and Office of Emergency Management
Edward Stettinius Jr. (1900–1949) – Chairman of US Steel; Secretary of State in FDR Administration; former home is now Staten Island Academy
Gustav Struve (1805–1870) – German journalist and revolutionary; American Civil War captain
George Augustus Vaughn Jr. (1897–1989) – World War I flying ace; co-founder of Vaughn College of Aeronautics and Technology
Katherine Walker (1848–1931) – keeper of Robbins Reef Light in New York Harbor; helped rescue more than 50 sailors
Theodore Winthrop (1828–1861) – one of the first Union officers killed in the American Civil War
James Zappalorti (1945–1990) – disabled veteran of the Vietnam War; victim of anti-gay murder

Musicians

Past

Roy Clark (1933–2018) – country music performer; co-host of the television show Hee Haw; spent his early years on Staten Island
Bobby Darin (born Walden Robert Cassotto, 1936–1973) – singer; his family had a summer home as a child in South Beach, Staten Island
The Elegants – had #1 hit record in 1959, "Little Star", recorded in a South Beach studio
Vincent Fanelli (1883–1966) – principal harpist of Philadelphia Orchestra and Kalamazoo Symphony Orchestra
Eileen Farrell (1920–2002) – singer of classical and popular music; lived on Emerson Hill and Grymes Hill
Force MDs – vocal group; several members were born and raised on Staten Island
Bobby Gustafson (b. 1965) – guitarist best known for the heavy metal band Overkill
George Harrison (1943–2001) – member of the Beatles; briefly lived in Staten Island while being treated for cancer at Staten Island University Hospital
Bill Hughes (1930–2018) – jazz trombonist and bandleader with the Count Basie Orchestra
Frankie LaRocka (1954–2005) – drummer and producer; played for Bryan Adams and Jon Bon Jovi; born and raised in South Beach
Q Lazzarus (born Diana Luckey, 1960–2022) – singer known for "Goodbye Horses", featured in the films Married to the Mob and The Silence of the Lambs
Carl Lesch (1924–1983) – music director and educator for Catholic churches and schools
Antoine "T.C.D." Lundy (1963–1998) – singer-songwriter with the Force MDs
Max Maretzek (1821–1897) – opera director and composer
Galt MacDermot (1928–2018) – musician and lyricist for musicals such as Hair and The Two Gentlemen of Verona
Patricia Neway (1919–2012) – operatic soprano and musical theater actress; won a Tony Award for The Sound of Music
A.J. Pero (1959–2015) – drummer for Twisted Sister
Charles Seeger (1886–1979) – musicologist in family of folk music specialists Ruth, Peggy, Mike, and Pete Seeger; brother of poet Alan Seeger
George Siravo (1916–2000) – saxophonist for Glenn Miller; orchestrator for Tony Bennett, Doris Day, Frank Sinatra
Axel Stordahl (1913–1963) – music director for hundreds of Frank Sinatra songs
Roland Trogan (1933–2012) – classical composer; lived on Staten Island
UMC's – 1990s hip-hop duo of Haas G and Kool Kim
Cherry Vanilla (born Kathleen Dorritie) – singer and publicist, including for David Bowie and Vangelis
Chuck Wayne (born Charles Jagelka, 1923–1997) – jazz guitarist with Woody Herman, George Shearing, and Tony Bennett

Recent

9th Prince (born Terrance Hamlin) – co-founder of rap group Killarmy; brother of Wu-Tang Clan co-founder RZA
Christina Aguilera – Mouseketeer; pop singer; judge on NBC's The Voice; born on Staten Island
Steve Augeri – former lead singer of the rock band Journey
Joan Baez – folk singer and activist; born on Staten Island; daughter of inventor and Wagner College professor Albert Baez
Eric Blackwood (born Eric Pastore) – guitarist and singer-songwriter for Edison's Children; brother of actor Garry Pastore and cousin of Vincent Pastore
Vito Bratta – guitarist for White Lion; lives on Staten Island
Cappadonna (born Darryl Hill) – rapper, Wu-Tang Clan member; born and raised on Staten Island
Richie Castellano – musician for Blue Öyster Cult
Lenny Cerzosie – lead singer of Staten Island hard rock band The Infinite Staircase
Ron Dante – lead singer for The Archies; number 1 song "Sugar Sugar"
Mark Delpriora – classical guitarist and composer; born and raised on Staten Island
Trife Diesel (born Theo Bailey) – rapper affiliated with Wu-Tang Clan
Eamon Doyle – rapper; born and raised on Staten Island
Anthony Esposito – former bassist for Lynch Mob and Ace Frehley; film producer; born on Staten Island
Frankee (born Nicole Francine Aiello) – R&B singer-songwriter
Reeves Gabrels – rock guitarist and songwriter with David Bowie, Tin Machine, and The Cure
Sandy Gennaro – drummer; raised in South Beach; played with Cyndi Lauper, Joan Jett, The Monkees and Pat Travers
Ghostface Killah (born Dennis Coles) – rapper, Wu-Tang Clan member; born and raised on Staten Island
Billy Graziadei – guitarist and lead singer for rap-rock band Biohazard
GZA (born Gary E. Grice) – rapper, Wu-Tang Clan founding member, born on Staten Island
Haas G (born Carlos Evans) – rapper also known as Fantom of the Beat, half of the 1990s duo The UMC's
Hanz On (born Anthony Messado) – rapper affiliated with Wu-Tang Clan
Inspectah Deck (born Jason Hunter) – rapper; Wu-Tang Clan member; born and raised on Staten Island
David Johansen – (also known as Buster Poindexter) of the New York Dolls
Blackie Lawless (born Steven Duren) – lead singer of the 1980s heavy metal band W.A.S.P.
Lil Suzy (born Suzanne Casale Melone) – freestyle singer
Method Man (born Clifford M. Smith) – rapper; Wu-Tang Clan member; born in Hempstead, Long Island, and raised on Staten Island
Ingrid Michaelson – Indie-pop singer/songwriter; a Staten Island Technical High School graduate
Kevin Norton – jazz and contemporary percussionist, composer, teacher
NYOIL (born Kim Sharpton) – rapper also known as Kool Kim, half of the 1990s duo The UMC's
Jeannine Otis – singer and theater professional
David Park – rap producer and recording engineer
Vito Picone – with The Elegants, recorded #1 hit of 1959, "Little Star", in South Beach
John Pisano – jazz guitarist, including long collaborations with Herb Alpert, Peggy Lee, Joe Pass
PS22 Chorus – prominent elementary-school chorus located in Graniteville; performed at the 83rd Academy Awards
Raekwon (born Corey Woods) – rapper, Wu-Tang Clan member; born in Brooklyn, raised on Staten Island
Vernon Reid – guitar player for Living Colour
Remedy (born Ross Filler, 1972) – rapper affiliated with Wu-Tang Clan
Bebe Rexha – singer-songwriter, grew up on Staten Island
Keith Richards – Rolling Stones guitarist; his wife Patti Hansen was from Staten Island; in the 1980s they owned a home on the South Shore
Rockell (born Rachel Alexandra Mercaldo) – freestyle pop singer
Daniel Rodriguez – operatic tenor known as "The Singing Policeman" for his former work in NYPD's Ceremonial Unit
RZA (born Robert Fitzgerald Diggs) – rapper, Wu-Tang Clan founding member, Grammy Award-winning producer
Shyheim (born Shyheim Dionel Franklin) – rapper affiliated with Wu-Tang Clan
Gene Simmons (born Chaim Witz, later Eugene Klein) – Kiss bass player; attended Richmond College
Earl Slick – guitarist, Phantom, Rocker and Slick; played with John Lennon
Peter Steele (born Peter Ratajczyk, 1962–2010) – lead singer and bassist for the gothic metal band Type O Negative
Steve Stoll (born Stephen Stollmeyer) – drummer and techno producer
Streetlife (born Patrick Charles) – rapper affiliated with Wu-Tang Clan
Kasim Sulton – bass player for Utopia, with Joan Jett and the Blackhearts; now a member of The New Cars
Ron "Bumblefoot" Thal (born Ronald Blumenthal) – guitar player for Guns N' Roses, raised in Bay Terrace
U-God (born Lamont Jody Hawkins) – rapper, Wu-Tang Clan member; born in Brooklyn, moved to Staten Island as a youth
Buz Verno (b. 1953) – bass guitarist, including for fellow Staten Islanders David Johansen and Cherry Vanilla
Kenny Washington (b. 1958) – jazz drummer
White Lion – hard rock band
Rusty Willoughby (b. 1966) – rock musician in the Seattle area since the 1980s
Wu-Tang Clan – influential hip-hop group; most of its founding members were from Staten Island; credited with giving Staten Island the nickname "Shaolin"

Politicians

Past

Eugenio Alvarez (1918–1976) – NY State Assembly 1973–1974
Edward J. Amann Jr. (1925–2009) – NY State Assembly 1953–1973
Robert S. Bainbridge (1913–1959) – NY State Senate 1943–1946
Samuel Barton (1785–1858) – US House of Representatives 1835–1837
Howard R. Bayne (1851–1933) – lawyer, historian, member of NY State Senate
Obadiah Bowne (1822–1874) – member of 32nd US Congress and a presidential elector
James A. Bradley (1830–1921) – New Jersey politician; founder of Asbury Park and Bradley Beach
John M. Braisted Jr. (1907–1997) – NY State Senate 1948–1952; District Attorney 1956–1975
Erastus Brooks (1815–1886) – NY State Senate 1854–1857, NY State Assembly 1878–1883
John Broome (1738–1810) – NY State Assembly 1800–1802, NY State Senate 1804, NY Lieutenant Governor 1804–1810
Ellsworth B. Buck (1892–1970) – US House of Representatives 1944–1948; opposed development of Fresh Kills Landfill
Aaron Burr (1756–1836) – third US Vice President; known for duel with Alexander Hamilton; died in Port Richmond
Thomas Child Jr. (1818–1869) – US House of Representatives 1855–1857, NY State Assembly, town supervisor of Northfield, Staten Island
Robert Christie Jr. (1824–?) – NY State Assembly, NY State Senate
Elizabeth Connelly (1928–2006) – NY State Assembly 1973–2000; first woman to win elective office in Staten Island
Robert T. Connor (1919–2009) – borough president 1966–1977
Henry Crocheron (1772–1819) – member of 14th US Congress
Jacob Crocheron (1774–1849) – member of 21st US Congress, brother of Henry
George Cromwell (1860–1934) – businessman, lawyer, NY State Assembly and Senate, first borough president of Staten Island
Harman B. Cropsey (c.1775–1859) – Richmond County Sheriff 1829–1831, NY State Senate 1832–1835; uncle of artist Jasper Francis Cropsey
Edward V. Curry (1909–1982) – NY State Assembly 1949–1952, NY State Senate 1955–1956, NY City Council 1958–1978
John Decker (1823–1892) – NY State Assembly; the last Chief Engineer of New York's Volunteer Fire Department
Johannes de Decker (1626–?) – Comptroller of New Amsterdam; negotiated 1664 colonial surrender to the British
Thomas Dongan (1634–1715) – Governor of NY Province; namesake of Dongan Hills
William Duer (1805–1879) – NY State Assembly; District Attorney; US House of Representatives
Joseph Egbert (1807–1888) – US House of Representatives 1841–1843
Rae L. Egbert (1891–1964) – NY State Senate 1935–1940; descendant of the farming family for which Egbertville is named
Daniel D. T. Farnsworth (1819–1892) – president of West Virginia Senate; second Governor of West Virginia
Edward E. Fitzgibbon (1847–1909) – Wisconsin State Assembly; born on Staten Island
Frank Fossella (1925–2014) – NY City Council 1985; uncle of Vito
Albert Jennings Fountain (1838–1896) – Texas Senate; New Mexico House of Representatives
John C. Fremont (1813–1890) – Civil War major general; first Senator from California; first Republican Party nominee for President; Governor of the Territory of Arizona
Samuel H. Frost (1818–?) – town supervisor of Westfield, Staten Island 1851–1856; NY State Senate 1870–1871
Anthony Gaeta (1927–1988) – borough president 1977–1984
James J. Galdieri (1896–1944) – Jersey City politician
James Guyon Jr. (1778–1846) – member of NY State Assembly and 16th US Congress
Robert E. Johnson (1909–1995) – NY State Senate 1941–1942, 1947
Abraham Jones (1725–1792) – member of 1st NY State Assembly 1777–1778; expelled and imprisoned for British Loyalist activity
David D. Kpormakpor (1935–2010) – Liberian law professor, Supreme Court justice, head of state 1994–1995
Nicholas B. La Bau (1823–1873) – NY State Assembly; NY State Senate; son-in-law of Cornelius Vanderbilt
Ralph J. Lamberti (born 1934) – borough president 1984–1989
Nicholas LaPorte (1926–1990) – NY City Council 1977–1985; deputy borough president 1985–1989
Robert Lindsay (1895/1896–1972) – NY City Council 1964–1972
Francis Lovelace (c.1621–1675) – second Governor of NY Province; purchased Staten Island from Native Americans and built farm
John A. Lynch (1882–1954) – NY State Senate; borough president 1922–1933
Caleb Lyon (1822–1875) – NY State Assembly; NY State Senate; US House of Representatives; Governor of the Territory of Idaho
Albert V. Maniscalco (1908–1998) – NY State Assembly; NY City Council; borough president 1954–1965
Charles J. McCormack (1865–1915) – NY State Assembly 1903; Richmond County Sheriff 1904–1907; borough president 1914–1915
Henry B. Metcalfe (1805–1881) – District Attorney; County Judge; US House of Representatives 1875–1877
S. Robert Molinari (1897–1957) – NY State Assembly 1943–1944; father of Guy; grandfather of Susan
Nicholas Muller (1836–1917) – NY State Assembly 1875–1876; US House of Representatives for 12 years during 1877–1902
James J. Murphy (1898–1962) – US House of Representatives 1949–1952; NY City Council 1954–1957
John M. Murphy (1926–2015) – US House of Representatives 1963–1981; convicted in Abscam bribery case
William L. Murphy (1944–2010) – District Attorney 1983–2003
Benjamin Nichols (1920–2007) – science educator and Democratic Socialist mayor of Ithaca, NY
Jerome X. O'Donovan (1944–2014) – NY City Council 1983–2001; great-grandson of Irish activists Jeremiah and Mary Jane O'Donovan Rossa
James A. O'Leary (1889–1944) – US House of Representatives 1935–1944; great-grandfather of Vito Fossella
Joseph A. Palma (1889–1969) – borough president 1934–1945
Harry J. Palmer (1872–1948) – NY State Senate 1929–1934
John Palmer (1842–1905) – Civil War officer; elected as NY Secretary of State
Ruth Perry (1939–2017) – Liberian senator, head of state 1996–1997
George M. Pinney Jr. (1856–1921) – Richmond County District Attorney; town supervisor of Castleton, Staten Island
Anning Smith Prall (1870–1937) – US House of Representatives 1923–1934; FCC Chair 1935–1937; namesake of Prall Intermediate School (I.S. 27)
Edmund P. Radigan (1889–1968) – NY State Assembly 1945–1948
John H. Ray (1886–1975) – US House of Representatives 1953–1962
William N. Reidy (1912–1952) – NY State Assembly 1949–1952
Joseph Ridgway (1783–1861) – Ohio House of Representatives 1828–1831; US House of Representatives 1837–1843
Lucio F. Russo (1912–2004) – NY State Assembly 1953–1974
Antonio López de Santa Anna (1794–1876) – five-time President of Mexico; retook the Alamo; exiled on Staten Island
Alfred E. Santangelo (1912–1978) – NY State Senate; US House of Representatives
Henry J. Seaman (1805–1861) – US House of Representatives 1845–1847
William Allaire Shortt (1859–1915) – NY State Assembly 1908–1911
William A. Stevens (1879–1941) – President of New Jersey Senate; New Jersey Attorney General
Vito J. Titone (1929–2005) – Associate Judge of New York Court of Appeals 1985–1998; father of Matthew
Daniel D. Tompkins (1774–1825) – NY Governor; US Vice President; established Tompkinsville, SI Ferry, Richmond Turnpike (Victory Blvd.)
Hannah Tompkins (1781–1829) – NY First Lady; US Second Lady; wife of Daniel
Minthorne Tompkins (1807–1881) – NY State Assembly; NY State Senate; son of Daniel and Hannah; co-founder of NY Republican Party, and Stapleton
Julia Gardiner Tyler (1820–1889) – second wife of US President John Tyler; resided in Staten Island after being widowed during the Civil War
Jacob Tyson (1773–1848) – town supervisor of Castleton, Staten Island; county judge; US House of Representatives 1823–1825; NY State Senate
Calvin D. Van Name (1857–1924) – NY State Assembly; borough president 1915–1921
Thomas J. Walsh (1891/1892–1955) – NY State Senate; District Attorney; Judge
Hubbard R. Yetman (1847–1924) – NY State Assembly; town supervisor of Westfield, Staten Island

Recent

Sal Albanese – NY City Council  1983–1997, representing Brooklyn; four-time mayoral candidate
Joseph Borelli – NY State Assembly 2013–2015; NY City Council 2015– ; conservative commentator
Justin Brannan – NY City Council, representing Brooklyn; former musician; attended College of Staten Island
David Carr – NY City Council 2021–
Ronald Castorina – NY State Assembly 2016–2018; judge 2021–
Alfred C. Cerullo III – NY City Council 1990–1994, commissioner 1994–1999, professional actor in theater and television
Michael Cusick – NY State Assembly 2003–
Serena DiMaso – New Jersey politician
Dan Donovan – District Attorney 2004–2015; US House of Representatives 2015–2018
Charles Fall – NY State Assembly 2019–
Stephen Fiala – NY City Council 1998–2001
Vito Fossella – Republican member of NY City Council 1994–1997; US House of Representatives 1997–2008; borough president 2022–
John Fusco – NY City Council 1992–1998; judge 1998–2013
Sara M. Gonzalez – NY City Council 2002–2013, representing Brooklyn; attended College of Staten Island
John T. Gregorio (1928−2013) – New Jersey politician
Michael Grimm – Republican member of US House of Representatives 2011–2014; former FBI agent
Kamillah Hanks – NY City Council 2022–
Janele Hyer-Spencer – NY State Assembly 2007–2010
Vincent M. Ignizio – NY State Assembly; NY City Council
Andrew Lanza – NY City Council; NY State Senate
John W. Lavelle (1949–2007) – NY State Assembly 2001–2007
Donna Lupardo – NY State Assembly, representing Binghamton; born and educated on Staten Island
Nicole Malliotakis – Republican, NY State Assembly 2011–2020; US House of Representatives 2021–
John J. Marchi (1921–2009) – NY State Senate 1957–2006; led Staten Island's NYC secession movement
Steven Matteo – NY City Council 2015–2021
Michael McMahon – NY City Council 2003–2008; US House of Representatives 2009–2010; District Attorney 2016–
Matthew Mirones – NY State Assembly 2002–2006
Kenneth Mitchell – NY City Council 2009; Executive Director of Staten Island Zoo 2010–
Guy Molinari (1928–2018) – NY State Assembly 1975–1980; US House of Representatives 1981–1989; borough president 1990–2001; father of Susan
Susan Molinari – US House of Representatives 1990–1997; keynote speaker for 1996 Republican National Convention
James Molinaro – borough president 2002–2013
James Oddo – Republican member of NY City Council 1999–2013; borough president 2014–2021
Michelle Paige Paterson – NY First Lady, wife of Governor David Paterson
Michael Reilly – NY State Assembly 2019–
Leticia Remauro – Republican county chair 1999–2002
Debi Rose – Democratic member of NY City Council for the North Shore of Staten Island, 2010–2021
Max Rose – Democratic member of US House of Representatives, 2019–2020
Diane Savino – NY State Senate 2005–
Philip S. Straniere – Staten Island Civil Court judge 1997–
Robert Straniere – NY State Assembly 1981–2004; brother of Philip
Michael Tannousis – NY State Assembly 2021–
Matthew Titone – NY State Assembly 2007–2018; Richmond County Surrogate Judge 2019–
Louis Tobacco – NY State Assembly 2007–2012
Eric N. Vitaliano – NY State Assembly 1983–2001; judge 2001–

Religion

Patrick Ahern (1919–2011) – Catholic priest and bishop
James Roosevelt Bayley (1814–1877) – nephew of St. Elizabeth Ann Bayley Seton; Catholic pastor of St. Peter's Church; Bishop of Newark; Archbishop of Baltimore
William H. Boole (1827–1896) – Methodist pastor and prominent Prohibitionist
Robert Anthony Brucato (1931–2018) – Catholic priest and bishop
Peter John Byrne (born 1951) – Catholic priest and bishop
Romi Cohn (1929–2020) – Orthodox Jewish rabbi, mohel, Holocaust survivor, and real-estate developer
Dorothy Day (1897–1980) – social activist and radical; co-founder of Catholic Worker movement and newspaper; candidate for sainthood
Edward Doane (1820–1890) – Congregationalist missionary to Pacific islands
Edmund J. Dobbin (1935–2015) – Augustinian Catholic priest and longest-serving president of Villanova University
John Christopher Drumgoole (1816–1888) – Catholic priest and founder of Mount Loretto Children's Home
John Murphy Farley (1842–1918) – Cardinal; Catholic Archbishop of New York; priest at St. Peter's Church 1870–1872
Joseph A. Farrell (1873–1960) – Catholic priest, teacher, namesake of Monsignor Farrell High School
Reuven Feinstein (born 1937) – Orthodox Jewish rabbi; head of the Yeshiva of Staten Island
George Henry Guilfoyle (1913–1991) – Catholic priest and bishop
Edward D. Head (1919–2005) – Catholic priest and bishop
Eliza Healy (1846–1919, known as Sister Saint Mary Magdalen) – one of the first African-American Catholic mother superiors, including of Notre Dame Academy, Staten Island
Metropolitan Ireney (born Ivan Dmitriyevich Bekish, 1892–1981) – primate of the Orthodox Church in America
Walter P. Kellenberg (1901–1986) – Catholic priest and bishop
Thomas John McDonnell (1894–1961) – Catholic priest and bishop
Richard Channing Moore (1762–1841) – Episcopal rector of St. Andrew's Church; Bishop of Virginia
William Muhm (born 1957) – Catholic priest, chaplain, bishop
Miguel Pedro Mundo (1937–1999) – Catholic priest and bishop
Patrick O'Boyle (1896–1987) – Cardinal; Catholic Archbishop of Washington; director of Mount Loretto 1936–1943
John Joseph O'Hara (born 1946) – Catholic priest and bishop
Frank Pavone (born 1959) – Catholic priest and anti-abortion activist
Satsvarupa das Goswami (born Stephen Guarino, 1939) – writer, poet, artist, and guru for the International Society for Krishna Consciousness
Elizabeth Ann Bayley Seton (1774–1821) – first American-born Roman Catholic saint; founder of American branch of Sisters of Charity; Staten Island resident in 1790s
Anson Phelps Stokes II (1874–1958) – Episcopal priest; secretary of Yale University; civil rights activist; son of namesake mining executive; father of namesake bishop
William Greenough Thayer (1863–1934) – Episcopal minister and educator, born in New Brighton, Staten Island
Terry Troia (born 1958) – Reformed minister; longtime leader of Staten Island's interfaith nonprofit Project Hospitality
Edmund James Whalen (born 1958) – Catholic priest and bishop; graduate and former principal of Msgr. Farrell H.S.

Science, mathematics, medicine

Oscar Auerbach (1905–1997) – pathologist who helped prove that smoking causes lung cancer
Nathaniel Lord Britton (1859–1934) – co-founder of New York Botanical Garden; donor of The Britton Cottage, now in Richmondtown
James Chapin (1889–1964) – ornithologist for American Museum of Natural History; author of the landmark Birds of the Belgian Congo
Helen Clevenger (1917–1936) – NYU chemistry student who was murdered in North Carolina
William T. Davis (1862–1945) – naturalist, entomologist, historian; co-founder of Staten Island Institute of Arts & Sciences
Samuel Mackenzie Elliott (1811–1875) – pioneer of American ophthalmology; abolitionist leader; lieutenant colonel
Allan L. Goldstein – biochemist, specializing in the thymus gland and the immune system
Augustus Radcliffe Grote (1841–1903) – entomologist, expert on butterflies and moths
Gary Hartstein – anaesthesiologist, emergency physician for Formula One racing events
Arthur Hollick (1857–1933) – paleobotanist, expert on fossil plants
Bruce Kershner (1950–2007) – forest ecologist, environmentalist, biology teacher
Rebecca Lancefield (1895–1981) – microbiologist at Rockefeller University and Columbia University; expert on streptococcal bacteria
Charles W. Leng (1859–1941) – naturalist, entomologist, historian; co-founder of Staten Island Institute of Arts & Sciences
Lily McNair – psychologist; past provost of Wagner College; president of Tuskegee University
John Coleman Moore (1923–2016) – mathematician and professor, specializing in algebraic topology
Peter Panzica (born 1965) – director of anesthesiology; Harvard Medical School faculty
John Peoples Jr. – physicist; past director of Fermilab and Sloan Digital Sky Survey
George H. Pepper (1873–1924) – archaeologist, specializing in Native American burial grounds
Leonard Radinsky (1937–1985) – paleontologist and professor, specializing in fossil mammals
Edward H. Robitzek (1912–1984) – tuberculosis expert and chief physician at Sea View Hospital; helped develop isoniazid antibiotic treatment
Doris Schattschneider – geometer and professor; first female editor of Mathematics Magazine
Leroy Louis Schwartz (1932/1933–1997) – pediatrician; health policy researcher
Lynn Steen (1941–2015) – mathematician and professor, president of Mathematical Association of America
Henry Taber (1860–1936) – mathematician and professor, specializing in linear algebra; brother of Shakespearean actor Robert Taber
Kaya Thomas – app developer; mentor with Black Girls Code
Thomas Gordon Thompson (1888–1961) – oceanographer and professor, specializing in the chemistry of the sea
Paul Torgersen (1931–2015) – engineering professor and president of Virginia Tech
Mikhail Varshavski – "Doctor Mike", celebrity physician
J. Lamar Worzel (1919–2008) – geophysical oceanographer, specializing in deep-sea acoustics and gravity measurements

Sports

Baseball

Tim Adleman (b. 1987) – Major League Baseball (MLB) and KBO League (KBO) pitcher; attended Georgetown University
Rich Aurilia (b. 1971) – MLB All-Star shortstop; attended  St. John's University 
George Bamberger (1923–2004) – MLB pitcher, pitching coach, and manager
Larry Bearnarth (1941–1999) – MLB pitcher and pitching coach, attended  St. John's University 
Cliff Brantley (b. 1968) – MLB pitcher; attended Port Richmond High School
Julie Bowers (1926-1977) - Negro League catcher, played for New York Black Yankees
Jerry Casale (1933–2019) – MLB pitcher; Staten Island resident
Gloria Cordes (Elliott) (1931–2018) – All-American Girls Professional Baseball League (AAGPBL) pitcher
Jack Cronin (1874–1929) – MLB pitcher from 1895 to 1904
Terry Crowley (b. 1947) – MLB outfielder and hitting coach, won World Series ring; attended Curtis High School
Karl Drews (1920–1963) – MLB pitcher; attended Ralph R. McKee CTE High School
Jack Egbert (b. 1983) – MLB pitcher
Brian Esposito (b. 1979) – MLB catcher; attended Staten Island Technical High School
Dude Esterbrook (1857–1901) – MLB third baseman and manager
Bobby Evans – MLB executive, including general manager of the San Francisco Giants
Frank Fernández – MLB catcher and outfielder, the "Staten Island Strongboy"; attended Curtis High School
Matt Festa – MLB pitcher
John Franco – MLB pitcher; Staten Island resident
Grover Froese (1916–1982) – MLB umpire and scout
Matt Galante – MLB bench coach; Staten Island resident
Frank Genovese (1914–1981) – MLB outfielder and scout, minor league manager; older brother of George
George Genovese (1922–2015) – MLB pinch hitter specialist, minor league manager; attended Port Richmond High School
Zack Granite – MLB outfielder; attended Tottenville High School
Lee Howard (1923–2018) – MLB pitcher in 1946 and 1947
John H. Johnson (1921–1988) – executive, president of National Association of Professional Baseball Leagues
Bill Lindsey – MLB catcher
Hank Majeski (1916–1991) – MLB third baseman and batting coach; minor league manager and Wagner College coach
Jason Marquis – MLB All-Star pitcher; attended Tottenville High School
Joe McDonald – MLB executive, including general manager of three teams; won six World Series rings
Matty McIntyre (1880–1920) – MLB outfielder; helped lead the Detroit Tigers to the World Series in 1908 and 1909
Frank Menechino – MLB infielder and designated hitter; attended Susan E. Wagner High School and University of Alabama
Pete Mikkelsen (1939–2006) – MLB relief pitcher
Rose Montalbano – AAGPBL infielder, 1951–1953
Larry Napp (born Larry Albert Napodano, 1916–1993) – MLB umpire
Joe Pignatano – MLB catcher and bullpen coach, won World Series ring
Sonny Ruberto (1946–2014) – MLB catcher; attended Curtis High School
Rich Scheid – MLB pitcher
George Sharrott (1869–1932) – MLB pitcher from 1893 to 1894 
Jack Sharrott (1869–1927) – MLB pitcher and outfielder from 1890 to 1893; cousin of George
Duane Singleton – MLB center fielder
Shea Spitzbarth – MLB pitcher
Jack Taylor (1873–1900) – MLB pitcher in the National League from 1891 to 1899
Bobby Thomson (1923–2010) – MLB All-Star third baseman and outfielder, hit "Shot Heard 'Round the World"; attended Curtis High School
Bill Traffley (1859–1908) – MLB catcher for the Chicago White Stockings
Tuck Turner (1867–1945) – MLB outfielder from 1893 to 1898
Billy Urbanski (1903–1973) – MLB infielder for the Boston Braves
Frank Umont (1917–1991) – MLB umpire, after several years playing football for the New York Giants
Anthony Varvaro (1984–2022) – MLB pitcher and Port Authority police officer; graduated from Curtis High School and St. John's University
Mookie Wilson – MLB center fielder; Staten Island resident

Basketball

Nicky Anosike – Women's National Basketball Association (WNBA) forward/center; attended St. Peter's Girls High School
O. D. Anosike – European professional forward/center; two-time Rebounding leader in NCAA Division I; attended Siena College; younger brother of Nicky
Renaldo Balkman – National Basketball Association (NBA) forward;  No. 1 draft choice of the New York Knicks; plays internationally
Ray Corley (1928–2007) – NBA guard, attended St. Peter's Boys High School
Mike Deane – head coach of college basketball teams, including Wagner College
Jennifer Derevjanik – WNBA guard; attended George Mason University and St. Peter's Girls High School
Billy Donovan – NBA guard and head coach; played for Staten Island Stallions of the United States Basketball League (USBL)
Jim Engles – head coach at Columbia University
Warren Fenley (1922–2009) – Basketball Association of America (BAA) forward (pre-NBA); coached Monsignor Farrell High School and Moore Catholic High School
Mouhamadou Gueye - professional forward for the NBA G League
Halil Kanacevic – European professional forward/center; attended Curtis High School
Hassan Martin – professional forward in Japan and Germany
Kyle McAlarney – professional guard in France, then head coach for his alma mater, Moore Catholic High School
Kevin O'Connor – NBA general manager and executive; attended Monsignor Farrell High School
Buddy O'Grady (1920–1992) – BAA guard (pre-NBA); head coach at Georgetown University
Jordan Parks – Basketball Bundesliga (BBL) forward 
Elmer Ripley (1891–1982) – Naismith Memorial Basketball Hall of Fame member; coached college teams, Olympic teams, and the Harlem Globetrotters
Ryan Rossiter – Japan Basketball League (JBL) forward, attended Siena College and Monsignor Farrell High School
Abdul Shamsid-Deen – International professional center; 2nd Round draft choice of the Seattle SuperSonics; attended Tottenville High School
Isaiah Wilkerson – Liga Nacional de Baloncesto Profesional (LNBP) guard, attended NJIT and Curtis High School
Andrew Wisniewski – European professional guard, attended St. Peter's Boys High School

Bowling
Joe Berardi (b. 1954) – Professional Bowlers Association (PBA) Hall of Fame member
Johnny Petraglia (b. 1947) – PBA Hall of Fame member
Mark Roth (1951–2021) – PBA Hall of Fame member

Boxing

Teddy Atlas (b. 1956) – boxing trainer and commentator; trained Michael Moorer and Mike Tyson; winner of the Sam Taub Award
Marcus Browne (b. 1990) – three-time Golden Gloves Champion; National PAL Champion; 2012 US Olympian
Tony Canzoneri (1908–1959) – three-time World Champion boxer
Frankie Genaro (born Frank DiGennaro, 1901–1966) – flyweight Gold Medalist at the 1920 Olympics
Oleg Maskaev (b. 1969) – heavyweight boxing champion
Bill Richmond (1763–1829) – British pugilist; born a slave in colonial Staten Island
Kevin Rooney (b. 1956) – former boxer and current trainer
Elijah Tillery (b. 1957) – cruiserweight and heavyweight professional boxer

Football

Emmanuel Akah (b. 1979) – National Football League (NFL) and NFL Europa offensive lineman
Lou Anarumo – coaching staff member of college and NFL teams 
Joe Andruzzi – NFL offensive lineman, won three Super Bowl rings
Dawn Aponte – NFL executive
Dan Blaine (1891–1958) – halfback, owner of the Staten Island Stapletons; brought team into NFL
Micah Brown –  Canadian Football League (CFL) and Arena Football quarterback
Irv Constantine (1907–1966) – NFL back, for one game with the Staten Island Stapletons; attended Curtis High School
Anthony Coyle – NFL offensive tackle for the Pittsburgh Steelers; attended Tottenville High School
Kevin Coyle – coaching staff member of college and NFL teams; Alliance of American Football (AAF) head coach
Dominique Easley – NFL linebacker, won a Super Bowl ring; attended Curtis High School
Gus Edwards – NFL running back for the Baltimore Ravens
Frank Ferrara – NFL defensive end; attended New Dorp High School 
Steve Gregory – NFL safety and coach; Detroit Lions defensive assistant
Percy Haughton (1876–1924) – college head coach, won three NCAA championships, College Football Hall of Fame member; baseball coach and investor 
Vidal Hazelton – NFL and CFL wide receiver, attended Moore Catholic High School
Jim Lee Howell (1914–1995) – NFL receiver and defensive back; head coach for the New York Giants and Wagner College
James Jenkins – NFL tight end, won a Super Bowl ring
Rich Kotite – NFL tight end, head coach of the Philadelphia Eagles and New York Jets; attended Wagner College
Shemiah LeGrande – NFL  and Indoor American football defensive tackle
Pete Lembo – coaching staff member of college teams
Dino Mangiero – NFL defensive lineman, attended Curtis High School
Tom Masella – head coach of several college football teams, including Wagner College
Hurvin McCormack – NFL defensive tackle, attended New Dorp High School
Dennis McKnight – NFL guard, coaching staff member of college and CFL teams; Hamilton Tiger-Cats offensive line coach
Dan Mullen – college football coach; graduate of Wagner College
Ollie Ogbu – NFL, CFL, and Arena football defensive tackle, attended St. Joseph by the Sea High School
Adewale Ogunleye – NFL defensive end; attended Indiana University and Tottenville High School
Eric Olsen – NFL center, attended Notre Dame
David Richards – NFL guard; 1983 USA Today High School All-American
Peter Rossomando – college head coach at Central Connecticut 
Lewis Sanders – NFL cornerback, attended University of Maryland and St. Peter's Boys High School
William Shakespeare (1912–1974) – college halfback at Notre Dame, College Football Hall of Fame member, "The Bard of Staten Island"
Mike Siani – NFL wide receiver, No. 1 draft choice of the Oakland Raiders; attended Villanova University
Jeff Stoutland – NFL coach, graduate of Port Richmond High School
Vernon Turner – NFL and NFL Europa running back, wide receiver, and return specialist; attended Curtis High School

Golf

Jim Albus (b. 1940) – winner of multiple tournaments on the PGA Tour Champions
Bill Britton (b. 1955) – tournament winner on the PGA Tour; won 1975 National Junior College Athletic Association Championship
Carolyn Cudone (1918–2009) – won a United States Golf Association (USGA) record five-straight U.S. Senior Women's Amateur Championships
Frank Esposito (b. 1963) – golfer on the PGA Tour Champions
Frank Hannigan (1931–2014) –  USGA Executive Director, TV golf analyst, Staten Island Advance golf columnist
Sean Kelly (b. 1993) – golfer on the Korn Ferry Tour
Isaac Mackie (1880–1963) – head professional at Fox Hills Golf Course in Clifton, where he won the Eastern PGA Championship in 1908
Joe Moresco (1931–2017) –  Hall of Fame member of the Metropolitan section of the Professional Golfers' Association of America (PGA)

Gymnastics
Olivia Greaves (b. 2004) – competitive gymnast, member of Junior National Team
Dominick Minicucci Jr. (b. 1969) – 1988 and 1992 Olympic gymnast

Hockey
Zach Aston-Reese (b. 1994) – National Hockey League (NHL) forward for the Toronto Maple Leafs
Nick Fotiu (b. 1952) – NHL and World Hockey Association (WHA) forward; first player from New York City (Staten Island) to play for the New York Rangers
Joe Gambardella (b. 1993) – NHL center for the Edmonton Oilers
Jack Krumpe (1936–2020) – multi-sport executive, including president of the New York Rangers, Islanders, Knicks, and Madison Square Garden
Kevin Labanc (b. 1995) – NHL right wing for the San Jose Sharks

Ice skating
Silvia Fontana (b. 1976) – Italian figure skater in the 2002 and 2006 Winter Olympics; born in Staten Island
Lynn Kriengkrairut (b. 1988) – ice dancer
Amar Mehta (b. 1990) – figure skater who represents India internationally

Martial arts
Nick Pace (b. 1987) – Ultimate Fighting Championship (UFC) bantamweight fighter
Ricco Rodriguez (b. 1977) – Winner of UFC Heavyweight Championship, World Jiu-Jitsu Championship, and ADCC Submission Wrestling World Championship

Racket sports
Sudsy Monchik (b. 1974) – five-time Pro World Champion racquetball player; attended Tottenville High School
Mary Ewing Outerbridge (1852–1886) – "mother of American tennis"; set up one of the first courts in the US; buried in Silver Mount Cemetery in Silver Lake; sister of industrialist Eugenius Harvey Outerbridge
Bob Wrenn (1873–1925) – four-time U.S. singles championship winner was tennis member of Richmond County Country Club

Soccer
Chris Agoliati (b. 1951) – American Soccer League and North American Soccer League forward and midfielder
Jack Hynes (1920–2013) – American Soccer League, outside right; National Soccer Hall of Fame member
George Weah (b. 1966) – FIFA World Player of the Year for 1995; president of Liberia since 2018
John Wolyniec (b. 1977) – Major League Soccer (MLS) forward for Red Bull New York

Track and field
Robby Andrews (b. 1991) – 2016 Olympic team and 2017 national champion in the 1500m run; Staten Island native
Ashley Higginson (b. 1989) – middle distance runner; set 3000m steeplechase record in 2015 Pan Am Games
Bill Jankunis (b. 1955) – 1976 Olympic High Jump competitor
Marilyn King (b. 1949) – pentathlete for Tottenville High School, AAU, Pan American Games, and 1972–1980 Olympic teams
Abel Kiviat (1892–1991) – 1912 Summer Olympics Silver Medalist in the 1500m run; world record holder; Gold Medal team in the 3000m relay

Wrestling

Tim Arson (born Timothy R. Calkins Jr., 1976–2015) – World Wrestling Council (WWC) wrestler
Tony Garea (born Anthony Gareljich, 1946) – World Wrestling Entertainment (WWE) wrestler
Vito LoGrasso (b. 1964) – WWE wrestler
Sean Maluta (b. 1988) – WWE wrestler known as "The Samoan Dragon"
Sabu (born Terry Brunk) – Extreme Championship Wrestling (ECW) champion
Randy Savage (born Randall Mario Poffo, 1952–2011) – World Championship Wrestling (WCW) and WWE wrestler known as "Macho Man"

Other
Carl Borack (b. 1947) – fencer; participated in the 1972 Summer Olympic Games
Rick Decker (1903–1966) – race-car driver, including the Indianapolis 500
Gary di Silvestri (b. 1967) – cross-country skier, 2014 Winter Olympics
William Butler Duncan II (1862–1933) – leader in New York Yacht Club's long defense of the America's Cup; adoptive son of banker W. Butler Duncan I
Loni Harwood – winner of two World Series of Poker bracelets
Daniella Karagach (b. 1992) – international dance competitor
John Henry Lake (1877–?) – Bronze Medalist in Cycling at the 1900 Summer Olympics
Krystal Lara (b. 1998) – Dominican-American swimmer; 2020 Summer Olympics; bronze and silver medalist in 2018 Central American and Caribbean Games
Robert Pipkins (b. 1973) – 1992 and 1994 Olympic luge
Ray Rudolph – 1980 Olympic handball team

Writers

Past

Henry H. Carter (1905–2001) – linguist, professor, specialist in Spanish and Portuguese translation
William Rossa Cole (1919–2000) – author, poet, anthologist, editor; grandson of Irish activists Jeremiah and Mary Jane O'Donovan Rossa
James Gould Cozzens (1903–1978) – short story writer and Pulitzer Prize-winning novelist
George William Curtis (1824–1892) – author, orator, reformer; namesake of Curtis High School
Donald Davidson (1917–2003) – influential philosopher and professor
William Main Doerflinger (1910–2000) – author and editor, including a major collection of folksongs (sea shanties)
John Drebinger (1891–1979) – sports editor for The Richmond County Advance, longtime baseball reporter for The New York Times, winner of 1973 Spink Award
Isaac K. Funk (1839–1912) – Lutheran minister; co-founder of Funk & Wagnalls Company, publisher of dictionaries and encyclopedias
Sydney Howard Gay (1814–1888) – journalist and abolitionist, active in the Underground Railroad
Emily Genauer (1911–2002) – Pulitzer-winning art critic
Langston Hughes (1902–1967) – poet; lived and worked for a season on a Staten Island farm growing vegetables
William James (1842–1910) – philosopher, and his younger brother, novelist Henry James (1843–1916), spent a few summers on Staten Island
Anna Leonowens (1831–1915) – travel writer and educator, governess for King of Siam; memoir evolved into The King and I
Richard Adams Locke (1800–1871) – editor of The New York Sun; presumed author of the "Great Moon Hoax"; lived on Staten Island
Laurence Manning (1899–1972) – science fiction author
Edwin Markham (1852–1940) – poet, school administrator, namesake of Markham Intermediate School (I.S. 51)
John William Martin (1864/1865–1956) – socialist academic, lecturer, writer; hosted many celebrity authors
Andy Milligan (1929–1991) – playwright and film director; resided in Staten Island
Kafū Nagai (born Nagai Sōkichi, 1879–1959) – Japanese author; wrote about his brief residence in American Stories
Frederick Nebel (1903–1967) – novelist and short story writer known for his hardboiled detective fiction
Francis Parkman (1823–1893) – historian of the American frontier
Emily Post (c.1872–1960) – columnist and author, best known for Etiquette in Society, in Business, in Politics, and at Home
Edwin Arlington Robinson (1869–1935) – three-time winner of Pulitzer Prize for Poetry, best known for the narrative poem "Richard Cory"
Armand Schwerner (1927–1999) – poet, best known for Tablets; professor at Staten Island Community College and College of Staten Island
Alan Seeger (1888–1916) – poet and World War I hero (I Have a Rendezvous with Death); brother of Charles Seeger; uncle of Pete Seeger
Theodore Sturgeon (1918–1985) – science fiction author; born on Staten Island
Henry David Thoreau (1817–1862) – essayist, philosopher, naturalist; spent his longest time away from Concord, Massachusetts on Staten Island in the 1840s
Amy Vanderbilt (1908–1974) – author of the best-selling Complete Book of Etiquette; distant cousin of Cornelius Vanderbilt
Phyllis A. Whitney (1903–2008) – prolific mystery writer; Staten Island resident during 1950s–1960s
William Winter (1836–1917) – poet, critic, biographer, theater historian
Paul Zindel (1936–2003) – novelist and Pulitzer-winning playwright, whose stories usually took place on Staten Island

Recent

Ayad Akhtar – playwright, novelist, screenwriter; won Pulitzer Prize for Disgraced
Melissa Anelli – webmistress of The Leaky Cauldron; author of Harry, A History
Tracy Brown – Essence best-selling author; born and raised in Mariners Harbor
Cheryl Burke (1972–2011) – poet, posthumous winner of Lambda Literary Award for Bisexual Literature
Gwen Carr – activist, public speaker, author, after her son Eric Garner was killed by police
Christopher Celenza – historian of the Italian Renaissance; dean of Georgetown University College of Arts and Sciences
Vito Delsante – comic book writer, including several issues of Scooby-Doo
Shawnae Dixon – chef, cookbook author
C. P. Dunphey – author of science fiction and horror stories
Alex Gino – winner of Stonewall Book Award and Lambda Literary Award for LGBT Children's Literature
Suheir Hammad – poet, author, Palestinian activist
Michael Henry Heim (1943–2012) – literary translator, fellow of the American Academy of Arts and Sciences
Tyehimba Jess – Pulitzer Prize winning poet, College of Staten Island professor
Charlie Kadau – longtime writer and senior editor for MAD magazine
Michael Largo – author of mostly non-fiction books, including Final Exits; The Portable Obituary; Genius and Heroin
Ki Longfellow – novelist, born on Staten Island; author of The Secret Magdalene
Lois Lowry – children's author, two-time Newbery Medal winner
Andrew Ostrowski – newspaper columnist, specializing in topics from his Polish and Catholic heritage
Brian Plante – writer, best known for science fiction stories
Darwin Porter (born 1937) – travel writer and celebrity biographer; lives in New Brighton in the former home of Howard R. Bayne 
Joe Raiola – longtime writer and senior editor for MAD magazine
Sarah Schulman – novelist, playwright, LGBT activist, College of Staten Island professor
Pam Sherman – Gannett columnist also known as "The Suburban Outlaw"
David O. Stewart (b. 1951) – historian and author
William J. Taverner – sex educator and author; grew up on Staten Island
Anthony Torrone (b. 1955) – author of Anthony's Prayers, inspired by his years in Willowbrook State School
Lara Vapnyar (b. 1975) – Russian Jewish emigre writer known for her novels and short stories

See also

List of people from New York City
List of people from the Bronx
List of people from Brooklyn

List of people from Queens
 Staten Island Sports Hall of Fame
:Category:Wagner College people

References

Staten Island
People